Thermosbaena is a monotypic genus of crustaceans belonging to the monotypic family Thermosbaenidae. The only species is Thermosbaena mirabilis.

The species is found in Southern Mediterranean.

References

Malacostraca
Malacostraca genera
Monotypic crustacean genera